George Dewey Yancy (born June 3, 1961) is an American philosopher who is the Samuel Candler Dobbs Professor of Philosophy at Emory University. He has been a professor of philosophy at Emory University since fall 2015. He is also a distinguished Montgomery Fellow at Dartmouth College, one of the college's highest honors. In 2019-20, he was the University of Pennsylvania's Inaugural Provost's Distinguished Visiting Faculty Fellow. He is also the editor for Lexington Books' "Philosophy of Race" book series. He is known for his work in critical whiteness studies, critical philosophy of race, critical phenomenology (especially racial embodiment), and African American philosophy, and has written, edited, or co-edited more than 20 books. In his capacity as an academic scholar and a public intellectual, he has also published over 200 combined scholarly articles, chapters, and interviews that have appeared in professional journals, books, and at various news sites. For example, as a public intellectual, Yancy has authored numerous influential essays and conducted intellectually engaging interviews at both The New York Times philosophy column "The Stone,"  and at Truthout. He has also published at CounterPunch, The Guardian, Inside Higher Ed, and The Chronicle of Higher Education. At "Academic Influence," Yancy is cited as one of the top 10 influential philosophers in the last 10 years, 2010-2020, based upon the number of citations and web presence. Yancy has been interviewed on various radio stations throughout the U.S. He has also appeared in two documentaries, Lillian Smith: Breaking the Silence, an independent documentary directed by Hal Jacobs and Henry Jacobs, with support from Georgia Humanities, 2019, and Rest in Power: The Trayvon Martin Story, a six-episode series released on July 30, 2018 on Paramount Network. Series was directed by Jenner Furts and Julia Willoughby Nason. Executive producers: Sybrina Fulton, Tracy Martin, Jay-Z, Chachi Senior, Michael Gasparro, Jenner Furst, Julia Willoughby Nason, and Nick Sandow.

Education and career
Yancy received his B.A. in philosophy from the University of Pittsburgh cum laude in 1985, his M.A. in philosophy from Yale University in 1987, his M.A. in Africana studies from New York University (NYU) in 2004, and his Ph.D. in philosophy from Duquesne University with distinction in 2005. He began teaching at Duquesne in 2005, progressing from assistant professor to full professor in just eight years, 2005-2013. After teaching at Duquesne for ten years, he moved to teach philosophy at Emory University in 2015.

As an undergraduate at the University of Pittsburgh, Yancy wrote his undergraduate honors thesis on Bertrand Russell's Sense Data theory.  His honors thesis was directed by prominent American philosopher and epistemologist Wilfrid Sellars. Also at Pitt, he studied Kant under Nicholas Rescher, studied with Adolf Grunbaum on Freud's theory of religion, studied Martin Heidegger under John Haugeland, and took a graduate seminar on Plato taught by Mary Louise Gill, and modern philosophy under Annette Baier. Yancy also took a course entitled Human Nature taught by prominent political theorist John W. Chapman, which explored questions of human nature from  Plato to Marx, Sartre, Freud and Skinner.  While at Yale University, he took graduate seminars with eminent philosophers such as John Edwin Smith (on pragmatism),  Maurice Natanson (on the thought of Alfred Schutz), Rulon Wells (on the philosophy of G. W. Leibniz), and others. While at New York University, Yancy took a seminar on democracy with political and economic theorist Leonard Wantchekon, a Black history course with historian Robert Hinton, and a seminar with poet Kamau Brathwaite in which Yancy was exposed to surrealism, magical realism, and radical decolonial ways to rethink W. Shakespeare's The Tempest.  The Consortium that existed between NYU and Columbia University allowed Yancy to enroll in a seminar on Gender and the Diaspora taught by cultural anthropologist Donna Daniels at Columbia University. Yancy also wrote his MA thesis under the direction of Columbia University's comparative literary theorist Farah Griffin.  While at Duquesne University, Yancy wrote his dissertation on race and embodiment under philosopher Fred Evans.

"Dear White America"
In 2015, Yancy published an article in the New York Times''' philosophy column, The Stone, entitled "Dear White America", which proved very controversial and resulted in his receiving large amounts of hate mail and harassment. This experience later helped convince the American Philosophical Association to issue a statement denouncing bullying and harassment. It also resulted in his being added to the Professor Watchlist, a website which purports to document anti-conservative college professors, in 2016. Anne Leighton was also instrumental in bringing attention and support through creating a petition in support of Yancy. He received over 1,000 messages of support. Also, 68 philosophers and intellectuals signed a letter in his defense, supporting his freedom and the freedom of others to engage in philosophical discussions regarding major social and political issues. In response to being placed on the Professor Watchlist, Yancy wrote an opinion piece in The New York Times entitled "I am a Dangerous Professor."

Works

Books
 Until Our Lungs Give Out: Conversations on Race, Justice, and the Future. (Rowman & Littlefield, 2023).
 Black Men from Behind the Veil: Ontological Interrogations. Edited and introduction by George Yancy (Lexington Books, 2022). 
 Across Black Spaces: Essays and Interviews from an American Philosopher. (Rowman & Littlefield, 2020)
 Buddhism and Whiteness: Critical Reflections. Co-edited and Introductory comments with Emily McRae (Lexington Books, 2019) 
 Educating For Critical Consciousness. Edited with Introduction by George Yancy (Routledge, 2019)
 Backlash: What Happens When We Talk Honestly about Racism in America. (Rowman & Littlefield, 2018)
 On Race: 34 Conversations in a Time of Crisis. (Oxford University Press, 2017)
 Black Bodies, White Gazes: The Continuing Significance of Race in America, Second Edition. Foreword by Linda Alcoff. (Rowman & Littlefield, 2017)
 Our Black Sons Matter: Mothers Talk about Fears, Sorrows, and Hopes. Co-edited with Maria del Guadalupe Davidson and Susan Hadley. Introduction by George Yancy. Afterword by Farah Jasmine Griffin. (Rowman & Littlefield, 2016). This book was a STARRED Review and was also selected as the Booklist Top 10 List of the Best Diverse Nonfiction Titles in 2017.
 White Self-Criticality beyond Anti-Racism: How Does It Feel to Be a White Problem? Edited with introduction by George Yancy. (Lexington Books, 2015)
 Exploring Race in Predominantly White Classrooms: Scholars of Color Reflect. (Critical Social Thought Series). Co-edited with Maria Del Guadalupe Davidson. Co-authored Introduction and additional submission of chapter. (Routledge, 2014)
 Pursuing Trayvon Martin: Historical Contexts and Contemporary Manifestations of Racial Dynamics. Co-edited and co-authored Introduction with Janine Jones and additional submission of chapter. (Lexington Books, 2013). The first paperback edition of this book was published in 2014 along with a new preface written by the editors.
 Look, A White! Philosophical Essays on Whiteness. Foreword by Naomi Zack. (Temple University Press, 2012)
 Christology and Whiteness: What Would Jesus Do? Edited with Introduction by George Yancy. (Routledge, 2012)
 Reframing the Practice of Philosophy: Bodies of Color, Bodies of Knowledge. Edited with Introduction and chapter by George Yancy. (SUNY Press, 2012)
 Therapeutic Uses of Rap and Hip-Hop. Co-edited and co-authored Introduction with Susan Hadley. (Routledge, 2011)
 The Center Must Not Hold: White Women Philosophers on the Whiteness of Philosophy. Foreword by Sandra Harding. Edited with Introduction by George Yancy. (Lexington Books, 2010). The Center Must Not Hold: White Women Philosophers on the Whiteness of Philosophy was reprinted in paperback edition in 2011. 
 Critical Perspectives on bell hooks. Co-edited with Maria Del Guadalupe Davidson. Co-authored Introduction and additional submission of chapter. (Routledge, 2009)
 Black Bodies, White Gazes: The Continuing Significance of Race. Foreword by Linda Alcoff. (Rowman & Littlefield, 2008). Received Honorable Mention from the Gustavus Myers Center for the Study of Bigotry and Human Rights.
 Philosophy in Multiple Voices. Edited with Introduction by George Yancy. (Rowman & Littlefield, 2007). Winner of the CHOICE Outstanding Academic Book Award for 2009. 
 Narrative Identities: Psychologists Engaged in Self-Construction. Co-edited with Susan Hadley. Preface by Yancy and Hadley. (Jessica Kingsley Press, 2005)
 White on White/Black on Black. Foreword by Cornel West. Edited with Introduction and chapter by George Yancy. (Rowman & Littlefield, 2005). Winner of the CHOICE Outstanding Academic Book Award for 2005.
 What White Looks Like: African American Philosophers on the Whiteness Question. Edited with Introduction and chapter by George Yancy. (Routledge, 2004)
 The Philosophical I: Personal Reflections on Life in Philosophy. Edited with Introduction and chapter by George Yancy. (Rowman & Littlefield, 2002)
 Cornel West: A Critical Reader. Afterword by Cornel West. Edited with Introduction and chapter by George Yancy. (Blackwell Publishers, 2001)
 African-American Philosophers: 17 Conversations.'' Edited with Introduction, and all interviews conducted by George Yancy. (Routledge, 1998). Winner of the CHOICE Outstanding Academic Book Award for 1999.

The New York Times and Truthout articles and interviews by George Yancy
 (with Talila A. Lewis), "Incarceration and Ableism Go Hand in Hand, Says Abolitionist Talila Lewis." January 8, 2023. 
 (with Talila A. Lewis), "Ableism Enables All Forms of Inequity and Hampers All Liberation Efforts." January 3, 2023.
 "Let's Honor Kevin Johnson by Dismantling the Systems that Failed Him," December 3, 2022. 
 (with Christine Wieseler), "The 'Problem' Isn't Disabled Bodies, It's the Violent Structure of Our Society." October 11, 2022. 
 (with Joel Michael Reynolds), "Ableism Organizes Most Social Life. How Do We Dismantle It?" September 25, 2022.
 (with Frank B. Wilderson III), "Afropessimism Forces US to Rethink Our Most Basic Assumptions About Society," September 14, 2022. 
 "Innocent White People Are Also Complicit in the Anti-Black Murders in Buffalo," May 17, 2022.
 (with Robin D. G. Kelley). "Robin Kelley: White Indifference Is Normalizing Spectacular Acts of Violence," May 5, 2022.    
 "If the State of the World Makes You Want to Scream, You're Not Alone," April 11, 2022.
 (with Adele Norris), "Anti-Black Racism IS Global. So Must Be the Movement to End It," March 14, 2022.
 "Death Surrounds US: We Cannot Ignore Its Reality, or Its Mystery," February 5, 2022.
 "Death Is for the Living." (The New York Times, physical copy). Tuesday, January 4, 2022, A16.  
 "What I learned About Death From 7 Religious Scholars, 1 Atheist and My Father," January 2, 2022. 
 "bell hooks, We Will Always Rage On With You," December 21, 2021. 
 "George Floyd Isn't in the Headlines, But Trauma Continues for Black Men Like Me," November 9, 2021. 
 "No, Black People Can't Be 'Racist,'" October 20, 2021. 
 (with Mark Lewis Taylor). "Christianity IS Empty If It Doesn't Address the Racist Carceral State," September 26, 2021.   
 (with Brian Burkhart). "US Founders Demonized Indigenous People While Coopting Their Political Practices," August 15, 2021.
 (with Akwugo Emejulu). "Black Feminist 'Back Talk' Anchors Resistance on Both Sides of the Atlantic," July 17, 2021.
 (with Kelly Brown Douglas). "Black Womanist Theology Offers Hope in the Face of White Supremacy," June 19, 2021.
 (with Robin D.G. Kelley). "The Tulsa Race Massacre Went Way Beyond “Black Wall Street”", June 1, 2021.
 (with David Roediger). "It's Time for 'Whiteness as Usual' to End: How do we overcome the death wish of white supremacy?", May 23, 2021.
 (with Noam Chomsky). "Chomsky: Big Pharma Cares More About Profiting From COVID Than Human Survival", May 10, 2021.
 (with Noam Chomsky). "Chomsky: Protests Unleashed by Murder of George Floyd Exceed All in US History", May 7, 2021.
 "Being 'Anti-Racist' Isn't Enough. The Violence of Whiteness Itself Must Be Exposed", April 5, 2021.
 (with Chelsea Watego). "'I Can't Breathe' Is a Cry Well Known to Black Indigenous People in Australia", March 24, 2021. 
 (with Susannah Heschel). "White Supremacist Christianity Drives Trump's Loyal Mob.  We Must Scream It Down", March 12, 2021.
 (with Cornel West). "Cornel West: The Whiteness of Harvard and Wall Street IS 'Jim Crow, New Style'", March 5, 2021.
 (with Elizabeth Stordeur Pryor). "White Journalists' Use of the N-Word IS an Intolerable Assault on Black Freedom", February 27, 2021. 
 (with Jacob Kehinde Olupona). "Death Has Many Names", February 14, 2021.
 (with Peniel E. Joseph). "The Capitol Siege Was White Supremacy in Action. Trial Evidence Confirms that", February 13, 2021.  
 (with Pedro A. Noguera). "Education Will Be Critical in the Fight for Democracy and Anti-Racism", February 5, 2021. 
 (with Joy James). "Reaching Beyond 'Black Faces in High Places' : An Interview with Joy James", February 1, 2021.  
 "Let's Not Lose Ourselves in Euphoria Over Trump's Exit. Anti-Blackness Persists",  January 25, 2021. 
 (with David Kyuman Kim). "We Have to Let White Supremacy Die in Order to Truly Live", January 17, 2021. 
 (with Eric Foner). "Capitol Mob Reveals Ongoing Refusal to Accept Black Votes as Legitimate”, January 12, 2021. 
 (with Che Gossett), "Black Trans Feminist Thought Can Set Us Free", December 9, 2020. 
 (with Leor Halevi). "Of Death and Consequences", December 8, 2020. 
 (with Mari Matsuda). "Trump Is Attacking Critical Race Theory Because it is a Force for Liberation", November 18, 2020.  
 (with Eduardo Mendieta). "Trump's Lying About COVD Amounts to Treason", November 1, 2020.
 (with Tracy Denean Sharpley-Whiting). "Founded on Inequality, Can the US Ever Be Truly Democratic and Inclusive?" October 31, 2020.
 (with Todd May). "How Should an Atheist Think About Death?", October 20, 2020.    
 (with Brook Ziporyn). "How to Die (Without Trying)", September 16, 2020.
 (with Pankaj Jain). "Don't Fear Dying. Fear Violence", July 29, 2020.
 (with Woojin Lim). "George Yancy: To Be Black in the US is to Have a Knee Against Your Neck Each Day", July 18, 2020.  
 (with Joe Feagin). "Confronting Prejudice Isn't Enough. We Must Eradicate the White Racial Frame", June 30, 2020. 
 (with Todd May). "Policing Is Doing What It Was Meant To Do. That's the Problem", June 21, 2020. 
 (with Noam Chomsky). "Noam Chomsky: Trump Has Adopted a 'Viva Death!' Approach to the Presidency", June 5, 2020.
 (with Karen Teel). "I believe that I Would See Her Again", May 20, 2020.
 "Ahmaud Arbery and the Ghosts of Lynchings Past", May 12, 2020.  
 (with Judith Butler). "Judith Butler: Mourning Is a Political Act Amid the Pandemic and Its Disparities", April 30, 2020.
 (with Moulie Vidas). "What Judaism Teaches Us About the Fear of Death", March 26, 2020. 
 (with Geshe Dadul Namgyal). "How Does a Buddhist Monk Face Death?", February 26, 2020.
 "Facing the Fact of My Death", February 3, 2020. 
 "Dear God, Are You There?", August 7, 2019. 
 (with Judith Butler). "When Killing Women Isn't a Crime", July 10, 2019.
 (with Cornel West). "Power Is Everywhere, but Love Is Supreme", May 29, 2019.  
 "Why White People Need Blackface", March 4, 2019.
 "#IAm Sexist", October 24, 2018.
 (with Anita L. Allen). "The Pain and Promise of Black Women in Philosophy", June 18, 2018.
 "Should I Give Up on White People?", April 16, 2018.
 (with Drucilla Cornell) "James Bond is a Wimp", February 26, 2018.
 "Will America Choose King's Dream or Trump's Nightmare?", January 15, 2018.
 (with David Kyuman Kim). "An Open Letter of Love to Kim Jong-un", November 13, 2017.
 (with Noam Chomsky) "On Trump and the State Of the Union", July 5, 2017.
 "Is Your God Dead?", June 19, 2017.
 "It's Black History Month. Look in the Mirror", February 9, 2017.
 "I am a Dangerous Professor", November 30, 2016
 (with Brad Evans) "The Perils of being a Black Philosopher", April 18, 2016.
 "Dear White America", December 24, 2015. 
 (with bell hooks) "Buddhism, the Beats and Loving Blackness", December 10, 2015.
 (with Seyla Benhabib) "Whom Does Philosophy Speak?", October 9, 2015.
 (with David Kim) "The Invisible Asian", October 8, 2015.
 (with Paul Gilroy) "What 'Black Lives' Means in Britain", October 1, 2015.
 (with Cornel West) "Cornel West: The Fire of a New Generation", August 19, 2015.
 (with Joe Feagin) "American Racism in the 'White Frame'", July 27, 2015.
 (with John D. Caputo) "Looking 'White' in the Face", July 2, 2015.
 (with Peter Singer) "Peter Singer: On Racism, Animal Rights and Human Rights", May 27, 2015.
 (with Molefi Kete Asante) "Molefi Kete Asante: Why Afrocentricity?", April 6, 2015.
 (with Anthony Appiah). "Kwame Anthony Appiah: The Complexities of Black Folk", April 16, 2015.
 (with Emily Lee) "Asian, American, Woman, Philosopher", April 6, 2015.
 (with Noam Chomsky) "Noam Chomsky on the Roots of American Racism", March 18, 2015.
 (with Falguni A. Sheth). "How Liberalism and Racism are Wed", February 27, 2015.
 (With Linda Alcoff), "Philosophy's Lost Body and Soul", February 4, 2015.
 (With Judith Butler). "What's Wrong With 'All Lives Matter?'", January 12, 2015.
 (with Joy James). "Black Lives: Between Grief and Action", December 22, 2014.
 (with Shannon Sullivan). "White Anxiety and the Futility of Black Hope", December 5, 2014.
 (with Charles Mills). "Lost in Rawlsland"), November 16, 2014.
 (with Naomi Zack). "What ‘White Privilege' really means", November 5, 2014.
 "Walking While Black in the White Gaze'", September 1, 2013.

See also
 Hypatia transracialism controversy

References

External links
 

Living people
African-American philosophers
20th-century American philosophers
Emory University faculty
1961 births
Duquesne University faculty
Duquesne University alumni
Critical theorists
University of Pittsburgh alumni
Yale Graduate School of Arts and Sciences alumni
New York University alumni
21st-century American philosophers
Philosophers from Pennsylvania